Funiculaire Saint-Imier - Mont-Soleil is a funicular railway in the Jura Mountains, Switzerland. The line leads from the village of Saint-Imier at 828 m to the station Mont-Soleil at 1179 m, on Mont Soleil (1291 m). The line of 743 m in length has a difference of elevation of 351 m at a maximum inclination of 60%.

Built in 1903 as a single-track line with two cars and a passing loop, the track was lengthened and converted to a single car operation in 2003. The line includes several bridges and a tunnel.

The base station is ca. 800 m from St-Imier railway station.

The railway is owned and operated by Funiculaire Saint-Imier - Mont-Soleil SA.

Further reading

References

External links 
Funisolaire

Saint-Imier
Transport in the canton of Bern
Metre gauge railways in Switzerland
Railway lines opened in 1903

fr:Funiculaire Saint-Imier - Mont-Soleil